Euclid is an unincorporated community in Butler County, in the U.S. state of Pennsylvania.

History
Euclid was founded ca. 1880, and named after fashionable Euclid Avenue, in Cleveland, Ohio.

References

Unincorporated communities in Pennsylvania
Unincorporated communities in Butler County, Pennsylvania